The Plücker matrix is a special skew-symmetric 4 × 4 matrix, which characterizes a straight line in projective space. The matrix is defined by 6 Plücker coordinates with 4 degrees of freedom. It is named after the German mathematician Julius Plücker.

Definition 
Its Plücker matrix is:

Where the skew-symmetric -matrix is defined by the 6 Plücker coordinates 

with

Plücker coordinates fulfill the Graßmann–Plücker relations

and are defined up to scale. A Plücker matrix has only rank 2 and four degrees of freedom (just like lines in ).

Properties 

The Plücker matrix allows us to express the following geometric operations as matrix-vector product:

 Plane contains line: 
  is the point of intersection of the line  and the plane  ('Meet')
 Point lies on line: 
  is the common plane , which contains both the point  and the line  ('Join').
 Direction of a line:  (Note: The latter can be interpreted as a plane orthogonal to the line passing through the coordinate origin)
 Closest point to the origin

Uniqueness 

Their Plücker matrix is thus:

Intersection with a plane 

Let  denote the plane with the equation

which does not contain the line . Then, the matrix-vector product with the Plücker matrix describes a point

and must therefore be their point of intersection.

In addition, the product of the Plücker matrix with a plane is the zero-vector, exactly if the line  is contained entirely in the plane:
 contains

Dual Plücker matrix 

In projective three-space, both points and planes have the same representation as 4-vectors and the algebraic description of their geometric relationship (point lies on plane) is symmetric. By interchanging the terms plane and point in a theorem, one obtains a dual theorem which is also true.

In case of the Plücker matrix, there exists a dual representation of the line in space as the intersection of two planes:

and

in homogeneous coordinates of projective space. Their Plücker matrix is:

and

describes the plane  which contains both the point  and the line .

Relationship between primal and dual Plücker matrices

As the vector , with an arbitrary plane , is either the zero-vector or a point on the line, it follows:

Thus:

The following product fulfills these properties:

due to the Graßmann–Plücker relation. With the uniqueness of Plücker matrices up to scalar multiples, for the primal Plücker coordinates

we obtain the following dual Plücker coordinates:

In the projective plane 

The 'join' of two points in the projective plane is the operation of connecting two points with a straight line. Its line equation can be computed using the cross product:

Dually, one can express the 'meet', or intersection of two straight lines by the cross-product:

The relationship to Plücker matrices becomes evident, if one writes the cross product as a matrix-vector product with a skew-symmetric matrix:

and analogously

Geometric interpretation 

and

References 
 
 

Algebraic geometry
Matrices